Dale E. Klein was the Chairman of the United States Nuclear Regulatory Commission under Presidents George W. Bush and Barack Obama. He served as Chairman from his July 1, 2006 until May 13, 2009. He then served as a Commissioner on the same body from May 13, 2009 until his resignation on March 29, 2010. He was the 13th chairman of the Nuclear Regulatory Commission.

Klein has a history of political donations to Republican candidates, including George W. Bush, Rick Perry, John Cornyn, and John McCain.

References

External links

Nuclear Regulatory Commission officials
George W. Bush administration personnel
People associated with nuclear power
Year of birth missing (living people)
Living people
Obama administration personnel